Galleguillos de Campos is a locality and minor local entity located in the municipality of Sahagún, in León province, Castile and León, Spain. As of 2020, it has a population of 88.

Geography 
Galleguillos de Campos is located 65km southeast of León, Spain.

References

Populated places in the Province of León